NGC 1852 is a star cluster in the Large Magellanic Cloud in the constellation Dorado.  It was discovered in 1826 by James Dunlop with a 9-inch reflecting telescope.

References

External links
 

1852
Dorado (constellation)
Star clusters
Large Magellanic Cloud
Astronomical objects discovered in 1826